The Inter-Disciplinary Programme (IDP) in Educational Technology was established by the Government of India at the campus of Indian Institute of Technology Bombay in 2010.  This is primarily a research group actively involved in research and education in the area of technologies to promote the learning-teaching process. It offers Ph.D and post graduate programmes.

Introduction
The research focus of the IDP-ET are innovative pedagogies and instructional strategies, technology enhanced learning of thinking skills, and teacher use of educational technology, Tools and Strategies.

See also
 Educational technology
 Higher-order thinking
 Historical thinking
 Divergent thinking
 Divergent thinking
 Design thinking
 Computational thinking

References

External links
 

IIT Bombay
Educational institutions established in 2010
Education in Mumbai
Educational technology